Henri Debehogne (30 December 1928 – 9 December 2007) was a Belgian astronomer and a prolific discoverer of minor planets.

Biography 

He was born at Maillen. Debehogne worked at the Royal Observatory of Belgium in Uccle, and specialized in astrometry of comets and minor planets.

He is credited by the Minor Planet Center with the discovery of over 700 numbered minor planets, including the Trojan asteroids (6090) 1989 DJ and 65210 Stichius (the latter with Eric Walter Elst) and hundreds of asteroids of the main-belt.

He died on 9 December 2007, at the age of 78 in Uccle. The asteroid 2359 Debehogne was named in his honor.

List of discovered minor planets

See also

References 
 

1928 births
2007 deaths
20th-century Belgian astronomers
Discoverers of asteroids